Jacobus van der Puije (c. 1754 – 24 June 1781) was an administrator of the Dutch West India Company. He became President of the council (acting Director-General) of the Dutch Gold Coast in 1780.

Biography 
Jacobus van der Puije was born in Middelburg to a family that originally came from Sint-Maartensdijk. His father was William van der Puije (born 1703). He was governor of Fort Crèvecoeur in Accra from 1776 till 1780, when he succeeded Pieter Woortman as the colonial governor of the entire Dutch Gold Coast.

Jacobus van der Puije had a daughter named Anna van der Puije with a slave named Asoewa. Anna van der Puije herself was also a slave and freed for 1 mark of gold, paid for by Jacob Rühle, who subsequently married her. He also had a son, Peter van der Puije (born c. 1775), with a local Ga woman from Accra by the name of Madam Ayeley Ablah.

Legacy 
Jacobus van der Puije is the direct patrilineal ancestor of the Vanderpuije (sometimes spelt as Vanderpuye) family in Ghana. Descendants include politicians Alfred Oko Vanderpuije, Edwin Nii Lante Vanderpuye and Isaac Nii Djanmah Vanderpuye, newsreader Claudia-Liza Armah-Vanderpuije, actor William Vanderpuye, and musician Joseph Bartlett-Vanderpuye.

Citations

References
 
 

1754 births
1781 deaths
People from Middelburg, Zeeland
Colonial governors of the Dutch Gold Coast
Dutch slave traders
Vanderpuije family of Ghana
18th-century Dutch businesspeople